Harbourmaster Hotel is a Grade II listed boutique hotel on the quay in the coastal town of Aberaeron, Ceredigion, west Wales. It is located in a distinctive French blue painted building, formerly the harbourmaster's home and later a whaler's inn, dating from 1811. The hotel, noted for its seafood restaurant, is especially lively during the annual Aberaeron Seafood Festival. The Good Hotel Guide awarded it a Cesar Award in 2005.

See also
 List of seafood restaurants

References

External links
Official site

Hotels in Wales
Buildings and structures in Ceredigion
Grade II listed buildings in Ceredigion
Grade II listed hotels
Hotel buildings completed in 1811
Georgian architecture in Wales
Seafood restaurants
Aberaeron